Red Arrows Football Club is a Zambian football club based in Lusaka that plays in the MTN/FAZ Super Division. They play their home games at Nkoloma Stadium in Chelstone, Lusaka.

The side is sponsored by the Zambian Air Force.

Honours
Zambian Premier League: 2
2004, 2022

Zambian Cup: 1
2007

Zambian Challenge Cup: 1
1982
Runner-up : 1978, 1989

Zambian Coca-Cola Cup: 0
Runner-up : 2003, 2004, 2005

Zambian Charity Shield: 2
2005
2022

Performance in CAF competitions
CAF Champions League:  2 appearance
2005 – Second Round
2021|2022]] - First Preliminary 

CAF Confederation Cup: 3 appearances
2009 – First Round of 16
2012 – Preliminary Round
 21 - Pre Group Stage

References

 
Football clubs in Zambia
Sport in Lusaka